Lystra is a genus of planthoppers in the family Fulgoridae, subfamily Poiocerinae. Species are distributed from North America to Brazil.

Species
 Lystra cerifera Villada, 1881
 Lystra lanata (Linnaeus, 1758)
 Lystra pulverulenta (Olivier, 1791)
 Lystra striatula (Fabricius, 1794)

References

Auchenorrhyncha genera
Poiocerinae